Calliostoma tornatum is a species of sea snail, a marine gastropod mollusk in the family Calliostomatidae.

References

tornatum
Gastropods described in 1798